Fuzzy Duck may refer to:
Fuzzy Duck (band), a progressive rock band from the UK
Fuzzy Duck (album), their self-titled sole album
Fuzzy duck, a drinking game